Kassym-Jomart Tokayev is a Kazakh politician and diplomat and the current Present of Kazakhstan.

Tokayev, or Tokaev, may also refer to the following people:
 Grigory Tokaev, Soviet scientist and politician
 Or Tokayev, Israeli rhythmic gymnast
 Turpal Tokaev, Russian kickboxer and actor